Elmira is a census-designated place (CDP) in Solano County, California, United States. The population was 188 at the 2010 census.

History
Elmira, California, is named after Elmira, New York.

In the 19th and early 20th century, Elmira was the major railroad stop between Fairfield and Davis. To get to Vacaville, travelers had to take a spur from Elmira. When U.S. Route 40 was built through Vacaville, the population of Vacaville increased in size, while the population of Elmira declined.

Geography

Demographics

2010
The 2010 United States Census reported that Elmira had a population of 188. The racial makeup of Elmira was 150 (79.8%) White, 10 (3.5%) African American, 10 (5.3%) Native American, 2 (1.1%) Asian, 0 (0.0%) Pacific Islander, 17 (9.0%) from other races, and 8 (4.3%) from two or more races. Hispanic or Latino of any race were 47 people (25.0%).

The whole population lived in households, no one lived in non-institutionalized group quarters and no one was institutionalized.

There were 85 households, 20 (23.5%) had children under the age of 18 living in them, 34 (40.0%) were opposite-sex married couples living together, 6 (7.1%) had a female householder with no husband present, 7 (8.2%) had a male householder with no wife present.  There were 6 (7.1%) unmarried opposite-sex partnerships, and 0 (0%) same-sex married couples or partnerships. 33 households (38.8%) were one person and 9 (10.6%) had someone living alone who was 65 or older. The average household size was 2.21. There were 47 families (55.3% of households); the average family size was 3.00.

The age distribution was 34 people (18.1%) under the age of 18, 14 people (7.4%) aged 18 to 24, 49 people (26.1%) aged 25 to 44, 65 people (34.6%) aged 45 to 64, and 26 people (13.8%) who were 65 or older. The median age was 43.4 years. The population was 54% male and 46% female.

The homeowner vacancy rate was 0%; the rental vacancy rate was 7.0%. 101 people (53.7% of the population) lived in owner-occupied housing units and 87 people (46.3%) lived in rental housing units.

2000
At the 2000 census, there were 205 people, 86 households, and 52 families in the CDP. The racial makeup of the CDP was 87.80% White, 1.46% African American, 1.46% Pacific Islander, 6.34% from other races, and 2.93% from two or more races. Hispanic or Latino of any race were 26.34% of the population.

Of the 86 households 27.9% had children under the age of 18 living with them, 39.5% were married couples living together, 12.8% had a female householder with no husband present, and 39.5% were non-families. 36.0% of households were one person and 7.0% were one person aged 65 or older. The average household size was 2.38 and the average family size was 3.12.

The age distribution was 24.9% under the age of 18, 7.8% from 18 to 24, 29.3% from 25 to 44, 29.8% from 45 to 64, and 8.3% 65 or older.  The median age was 38 years. The population was 52.7% male and 47.3% female.

The median household income was $48,438, based on a sample of the population. The per capita income for the CDP was $35,397. None of the families and 7.0% of the population were living below the poverty line.

See also
Vaca Valley and Clear Lake Railroad

References

Census-designated places in Solano County, California
Census-designated places in California